Sigfrido Ignacio Cuen Rodelo (born July 31, 1953), better known as Sigfrido Cuen Rodelo, is a Mexican engineer, philanthropist and former businessman, best known for his contributions as a member of Rotary International.

He is a former electrical contractor, Club Rotario La Paz Guaycura past president, 4100 Rotary District past governor and former Club Rotario Guadalajara Colomos president.

He is also known for developing the Dos Mares tunnel, which connects the luxury private resort The Resort at Pedregal with downtown Cabo San Lucas.

References 

1953 births
Living people
Mexican engineers
Mexican philanthropists
Rotary International leaders